Enoch Jasper Vann (1832 - 1920 or 1921) was a lawyer and state legislator in Florida. He was a Whig. He represented Madison, Florida.

He graduated from the University of North Carolina in 1854.

As a judge he presided over a trial in Jasper, Florida. He served on a state railroad commission.

He and his lawyer disputed election results from the 1878 state senate campaign.

The Florida Archives have a photo of him.

References

Year of birth missing
Whig Party (United States) politicians
Florida state senators